Kithore Assembly constituency is one of the 403 constituencies of the Uttar Pradesh Legislative Assembly, India. It is a part of the Meerut district and one of the five assembly constituencies in the Meerut Lok Sabha constituency. First election in this assembly constituency was held in 1957 after the "DPACO (1956)" order was passed and the constituency was constituted in 1956. The constituency was assigned identification number 46 after the "Delimitation of Parliamentary and Assembly Constituencies Order, 2008" was passed. In 1991 elections were not held in this constituency.
Tyagi and Muslim Communities are dominant in Kithore Assembly Constituency.

Wards / Areas
Extent of Kithore Assembly constituency is KC Machhara & Kithore NP of Mawana Tehsil; KCs Rajpura, Kharkhauda & Kharkhauda NP of Meerut Tehsil.

Members of the Legislative Assembly

Election results

2022

2017

16th Vidhan Sabha: 2012 General Elections.

See also
Meerut district
Meerut Lok Sabha constituency
Sixteenth Legislative Assembly of Uttar Pradesh
Uttar Pradesh Legislative Assembly

References

External links
 

Assembly constituencies of Uttar Pradesh
Politics of Meerut district
Constituencies established in 1956
1956 establishments in Uttar Pradesh